Zoran Alimpić (born 20 October 1965) is the former Chairman of the Assembly of the City of Belgrade. 

He was born in Pančevo. He has lived in Belgrade since 1968, where he finished primary school, secondary architectural-engineering school, and Faculty of Forestry at the University of Belgrade.

After the Mayor of Belgrade, Nenad Bogdanović, died in September 2007, Zoran Alimpić served as the acting mayor until the election of Dragan Đilas.

He was a councilor of the Municipal Assembly of Čukarica in three terms, from 1994 to 2004 and has been a councilor of the City of Belgrade Assembly since 1996. He was the Chairman of the Municipal Assembly of Čukarica in two terms – from 1997 to November 2004. Since July 2004 he has been a Member of the National Assembly of Serbia. He is currently a councilor of the Assembly of the City of Belgrade.

He is currently the Deputy Chairman of the City Board of the Democratic Party.

See also
 Mayor of Belgrade

References

External links
Chairman of the Assembly

1965 births
Mayors of Belgrade
Living people
Politicians from Pančevo
University of Belgrade Faculty of Forestry alumni
Democratic Party (Serbia) politicians